Dr. Hiralal Chaudhuri (21 November 192112 September 2014) was an Indian Bengali fisheries scientist. He was the father of induced breeding of the carp. The Blue revolution in India was developed on the basis of seed production technology through Hypophysation by him. He later led the way in intensive mixed farming to increase fish production in ponds.

Early life and education 
Hiralal Chaudhuri was born on 21 November 1921 in the village of Kubajpur, adjacent to the Surma Valley in Sylhet (then Srihatta), Assam (in present-day Bangladesh), British India. His father Girish Chandra Chaudhuri was a civil engineer and an officer under the Government of Assam. His mother was Soroshibala Chaudhuri. Hiralal was a very talented student from his early days. He completed his primary education from Laban Bengali Primary School, Shilong. He passed matriculation from Gomes School in Sylhet in 1936 with letters in four subjects. Due to being a meritorious student, he was admitted to ISC on the scholarship of meritorious students of Bangabasi College, Calcutta. He became the first in B.Sc with Honors in 1941 and passed M.Sc in Zoology from Baliganj Science College under University of Calcutta in 1943. In 1954, he went to the USA for a special training under the guidance of H. S. Swingle at Auburn  University. Later in 1955, he obtained an MS degree in Fisheries management from Auburn University in Alabama, USA for his thesis paper on the effect of pituitary injection on pond fish reproduction. Then he moved back to India and received Ph.D. from Calcutta University in 1961. The subject of his research was the effect of pituitary injection on fish breeding. In 2010, the Central Institute of Fisheries Education, Deemed University conferred his degree of D.Sc.

Professional career 
After passing his M.Sc., he started teaching in the Department of Biology at Murari Chand College, Sylhet. In the period of Partition of India, he lost his job with five colleagues. Then he migrated to India and joined the Central Inland Fisheries Research Institute (then Manirampur Central Fisheries Station) near Barrackpore on June 1, 1948 as a Junior Research Assistant. Beside the headquarter, he also researched in the CIFRI regional center at Cuttack, Orissa. In Cuttack CIFRI center he served as  Junior  Research  Assistant  from 1948-50, Senior  Research  Assistant  from 1950-55, Fishery  Extension  Officer  from 1959-60, Fish  Breeding-in-Charge  from 1960-63 and also the  Officer-in-Charge in 1964. He then worked in the Fish Culture  Division of Bhubaneswar from 1971-75 (present day Central Institute of Freshwater Aquaculture). He also served as a director of CIFRI on various sessions. He held various posts till his retirement in 1993. In the period of 1967-76, he worked as a Fishery  Advisor of Food and Agricultural Organization/United Nations Development Programme (FAO/UNDP) in Myanmar. After taking voluntary retirement from active government service, he joined the Southeast Asian Fisheries Development Center (SEAFDEC) and served as a deputy director from 1975-79. During 1988-93 he served as a visiting professor at UPLB in the Philippines.

Induced breeding methods 
While in the center of Barrackpore, he notices that oval-shaped transparent eggs come out as soon as he presses the belly of the fish floating in the tidal waters on the banks of the Ganges. After a few hours in a container, he saw the transmission of life. This phenomena attract Hiralal to think about the induced reproductive process in Carp. After nine years of research on fish endocrinology and physiology as a Senior Research Assistant at Cuttack Fisheries Laboratory, on July 10, 1956, he succeeded in the induced breeding of carp species, which is considered to be one of the first basic works in zoology. He further continued his research on riverine Catfish to breed by injecting pituitary hormone. He also improved the hypophysation technique on Puntius sarana, Cirrhinus mrigala, Labeo rohita and other Indian carp. In 1958 Prof. Heralal Chaudhuri succeeded for the first time in the world to hybridise carps by crossing major and minor carps of the genera Labeo, Cirrhinus, Catla. He also elaborated on the twelve new hybrids of the carp species, the insect infestation in the pond and its remedies and the methods of rearing the pond in a scientific manner. At this moment different countries of the world like Myanmar (then Burma), Lao PDR, Fiji, Sudan, Malaysia and the Philippines sought his skills for successful fish breeding programs.

Honours 
 Chandrakala  Hora Memorial Gold Medal, 1960
 Rafi Ahmed Kidwai Award
 Gamma Sigma Delta Award
 Golden Key  Award of the Auburn University, USA
 World Aquaculture  Award, 1994
 Asiatic Society Award, 6 May, 2002
 Honorary D.Sc by Central Institute of Fisheries Education, Mumbai
 Chair in Fisheries in the name of Hiralal Chaudhuri by University of Calcutta
 In 2001 Indian Government announced 10 July as the National Fish Farmers Day to honor Prof. Chaudhuri.
Hiralal Chaudhuri was honoured as the Father of induced breeding of the Carp and also considered as the pioneer of Blue revolution in the world. In September 1994, A conference on Applications of Endocrinology to Pacific Rim Aquaculture was organised in his honor at the Bodega Merin Laboratory of  University of California.

References 

1921 births
2014 deaths
Fisheries scientists
Scientists from West Bengal
20th-century Indian zoologists
University of Calcutta alumni
Academic staff of the University of Calcutta
Bengali Hindus
Indian expatriates in the United States